The Dutch sloop Sireene (or Sirène) was launched in 1786. The British captured her in 1796 at the capitulation of Saldanha Bay. She then served in the Royal Navy, first briefly as the sixth rate HMS Daphne, and then from 1798 as the prison ship HMS Laurel. The Admiralty sold her in 1821.

Dutch service and capture
Sireene was a ship sloop with a quarter deck, built at Haarlingen in 1786 for the Dutch admiralty under the 7th Charter.

At Saldanha Bay a squadron of the Batavian Navy, under the command of Rear-Admiral Engelbertus Lucas, surrendered without a fight to a Royal Navy squadron under the command of Vice-Admiral George Elphinstone at Saldanha Bay on 17 August 1796. Sireene was one of the vessels that the British captured. At the time of her capture, Sireene was armed with 18 guns, and had a crew of 130 men. She was under the command of Lieutenant Christiaan de Cerf.

British service

The Royal Navy commissioned her in May 1797 under Commander James Brisbane for transit back to Britain. Sireene arrived at Portsmouth on 5 September 1797. The Admiralty renamed her HMS Daphne, and Commander Benjamin Page replaced Brisbane, but she was paid off in November.

In 1797 the Royal Navy re-captured  from the French. The decision was taken to give her back her original name, and to rename the ex-Sireene HMS Laurel, HMS Laurel having been sold shortly before. In December 1797 Laurel was fitted at Portsmouth in 1798 for service as a convict ship.

Fate
The Admiralty offered Laurel for sale in June 1821 at Portsmouth. She was sold on 6 July 1821 at Portsea for £610. Mr. Holmes, the buyer, broke her up.

Notes

Citations

References
Government of the Cape Colony (1899) Records of the Cape Colony from February 1793, Vol. 5. 

 
 
 

Ships built in the Netherlands
1786 ships
Sixth rates of the Royal Navy
Captured ships
Prison ships